People of the Finnish Forests (Swedish: Finnskogens folk) is a 1955 Swedish period drama film directed by Ivar Johansson and starring Birger Malmsten, Kerstin Wibom and Adolf Jahr. It was shot at the Centrumateljéerna Studios in Stockholm. The film's sets were designed by the art director Nils Nilsson.

Synopsis
At the beginning of the twentieth century, a new pastor arrives in an area near the Fryken lakes inhabited traditional by Forest Finns. He attempts to lead a religious revival in the region.

Cast
 Birger Malmsten as 	David Amberg
 Kerstin Wibom as 	Marit
 Adolf Jahr as 	Skomakar-Jöns Bengtsson
 John Elfström as 	Kron-Johan
 Eivor Landström as 	Olga Lundell
 Olle Gillgren as 	Klas
 Margareta Nisborg as 	Britta
 Rune Stylander as 	Sverre
 Helga Brofeldt as 	Böret Hindriksson
 Åke Claesson as 	Doctor Remberg
 Birger Lensander as 	Peasant giving David a ride
 Olof Thunberg as 	Even

References

Bibliography 
 Qvist, Per Olov & von Bagh, Peter. Guide to the Cinema of Sweden and Finland. Greenwood Publishing Group, 2000.

External links 
 

1955 films
1955 drama films
1950s Swedish-language films
Films directed by Ivar Johansson
Swedish black-and-white films
Swedish historical drama films
1950s historical drama films
Films set in the 1900s
1950s Swedish films